26 Arietis is a variable star in the northern constellation of Aries. 26 Arietis is the Flamsteed designation; it also bears the variable star designation UU Arietis. The apparent visual magnitude of this star is 6.14, which, according to the Bortle Dark-Sky Scale, is within the naked eye visibility limit in dark rural skies. The star is receding from the Earth with a heliocentric radial velocity of +15 km/s.

This is an A-type main sequence star with a stellar classification of A9 V. It is a Delta Scuti variable with a variability period of 0.0676 days and an amplitude of 0.010 in magnitude. The star is around a billion years old with 1.74 times the mass of the Sun and 2.32 times the Sun's radius. The star is radiating 15 times the luminosity of the Sun from its photosphere at an effective temperature of 7,430 K.

References

External links
 HR 729
 Image 26 Arietis

A-type main-sequence stars
Delta Scuti variables
Aries (constellation)
Durchmusterung objects
Arietis, 26
015550
011678
0729
Arietis, UU